On 19 June 1985, a bombing at the Frankfurt Airport, West Germany, killed three and wounded 74 people. A second bomb was found and defused not far from the first explosion. Two of those killed were Australian children, 2-year-old and 5-year-old siblings, and the third a Portuguese man.

About 30 groups claimed responsibility, among them an unprecedented group calling itself Arab Revolutionary Organisation, having done so because of West German intelligence recruiting Arabs to assassinate members of Arab revolutionary movements in Lebanon. In July 1988, West German investigators concluded that the Palestinian Abu Nidal Organization, which itself had also claimed responsibility, had perpetrated the attack, and that the Libyan embassy in Bonn had pre-knowledge of the attack. The investigators also claimed that Libyan leader Muammar Gaddafi may have played a role in the attack.

See also
1985 Rome and Vienna airport attacks
1985 Rhein-Main Air Base bombing
1986 West Berlin discotheque bombing

References

External links
 View of the destroyed hall B after a bomb exploded at the airport in Frankfurt (Germany) on 19 June 1985

1985 in international relations
1985 in West Germany
1980s in Frankfurt
1985 murders in Germany
Abu Nidal attacks
Crime in Frankfurt
Improvised explosive device bombings in 1985
Improvised explosive device bombings in Germany
June 1985 crimes
June 1985 events in Europe
Murder in Hesse
Palestinian terrorist incidents in Germany
Terrorist attacks on airports
Terrorist incidents in Germany in 1985
Building bombings in Germany